Domenig is a last name and may refer to
 Aya Domenig, a film-maker and anthropologist of Japanese–Swiss origin.
 Günther Domenig, an Austrian architect.